Altaturk is a townland of 283 acres in County Armagh, Northern Ireland. It is situated in the historic barony of Oneilland West and up until 1851 in the civil parish of Loughgall after which it was transferred to Kildarton civil parish.

See also
List of townlands in County Armagh

References

Townlands of County Armagh
Civil parish of Loughgall